Team Unity may refer to:

TEAM Unity (Philippines), a 2007 electoral alliance
Team Unity (Saint Kitts and Nevis), a 2015 political alliance